Castellum Ripae (literally "Riverbank Forification") or Hadjar-Ouaghef is a locality and  archeological site in Algeria, North Africa.

History
During the Roman Empire Hadjar-Ouaghef was known as Castellum Ripae. It appears to have been a civitas in of the Roman province of Mauretania Caesariensis. Castellum Ripae has been identified with a set of ruins near Hadjar-Ouaghef.

Ancient Castellum Ripae was also the seat of a Christian bishopric during late antiquity. The only known bishop of this diocese is Cereale, who took part in the synod assembled in Carthage in 484 by the Vandal King Huneric, after which Cereale was exiled.

Although the see ceased to effectively function with the Muslim conquest of the Maghreb, today the bishopric survives as a titular bishopric of the Roman Catholic Church, and the current bishop is Jose Pandarassery, of Kottayam.

At the beginning of French colonialism a fort was established here and it became a de facto entry into the Tafna Valley.

References

Archaeological sites in Algeria
Catholic titular sees in Africa
Roman towns and cities in Mauretania Caesariensis
Ancient Berber cities